The current Penal Code of Macau was promulgated in 1995, by Decree-Law no. 58/95/M, after the creation of the High Court of Justice in 1993. Prior to 1995, the 1886 Penal Code of Portugal applied to Macau.

Like Hong Kong, criminal law in Macau is different from what is applied in China.

See also
 Legal system of Macau
 Crimes Ordinance (Hong Kong)

References

External links
 Penal Code – hosted on the website of the Government Printing Bureau 
 A Partial English translation of the Macau Penal Code by Prof. Jorge Godinho

Macau
Macau law